Florida is a Barcelona Metro station, in the L'Hospitalet de Llobregat municipality of the Barcelona metropolitan area, and named after the nearby La Florida neighbourhood. The station is served by line L1.

The station is located below the Avinguda Catalunya, between the Carrer Ceravalls and Carrer Mimoses. It has two entrances, from the Placa Blocs Florida and the Avinguda Masnou, which serve an underground ticket hall.

The station opened in 1987, when line L1 was extended from Torrassa station to Avinguda Carrilet station.

See also
List of Barcelona Metro stations
Transport in L'Hospitalet de Llobregat

References

External links

Barcelona Metro line 1 stations
Railway stations in Spain opened in 1987
Railway stations in L'Hospitalet de Llobregat
Railway stations located underground in Spain